A manor house of Polish nobility is called dwór or dworek in Polish.

The architectural form of the Polish manor house  evolved around the late Polish Renaissance period and continued until the Second World War, which, together with the  communist takeover of Poland, spelled the end of the nobility in Poland. A 1944 decree nationalized most mansions as property of the nobility; few were adapted to other purposes and many slowly fell into ruin. A vast majority of such mansions remain unused and are slowly deteriorating.

Architectural history
During the times of the Polish–Lithuanian Commonwealth, Polish nobility built manor houses in the countryside. This was a preferred location for one's residence, as the nobility, following the sarmatism ideology, felt contempt for the cities, even though members of this elite also had residences in a major city or town (but, these were large lateral apartments rather than town houses).

The vast majority of such countryside manors in the beginning were made of wood. They tended to fall into two types: rare palaces of the magnates, and smaller, one-story houses, in which wood was the most common building material. Starting with the Renaissance period, mansions built with masonwork appeared, often designed to enhance their defensive characteristics. Although early on, such mansions were often designed as defensive mini-fortresses, over time - around the baroque period - the defensive function began to disappear.

The smallest ones had 2-4 rooms. Larger ones would have many more, including guest rooms and a chapel. Magnates' palaces would even boast their own opera house. Common furniture included benches, cupboards, tables, beds and small chairs, commonly made from tilia wood. Rarer furniture would include chests and wardrobes. Furniture was often painted (green being the most common color), sometimes engraved and inlaid. Walls were often painted with floral or moral and historical motifs, and decorated with Oriental (Persian, Turkish) or West European (Belgian, Flemish, French) tapestries and rugs, coats of arms, portraits, mirrors, weapons and trophies. Floors were wooden. Ceilings were carved and decorated with various hanging decorations (including candelabras). Windows in the richest mansions would be fitted with Venetian glass, and the rest would use green glass or waxed canvas. Stoves were common. Depending on a family's wealth, they would be made of materials from rough earthenware to porcelain and alabaster.

Early renaissance mansions were based on a rectangular design, with corner chambers (alkierze) and a porch. The roof was a Polish variant of the hip roof (:pl:Łamany dach polski) covered with shakes. In the baroque period, alkierze were replaced by risalits, and mansard roofs appeared. The Classicism period saw porches replaced by porticos with tympanums.

The dwór style design was also popular in the Second Polish Republic (Polish: styl narodowy or styl dworkowy), and is still inspiring some modern Polish manors.

See also
 Houses in Poland
 Polish architecture

References

External links

Social history of the Polish–Lithuanian Commonwealth